Skeleton at the 2012 Winter Youth Olympics was held at the Olympic Sliding Centre Innsbruck in Igls, Innsbruck, Austria on 16 January. The competition had a boys' and a girls' event.

Qualification System
Each nation can send a maximum of 4 athletes (2 boys and 2 girls). The FIBT ranking will be used to allocate places to NOC's. Participation, for each of the men’s and women’s competitions, is limited to a total of 15 athletes, including the host nation. The NOC quotas are based on the updated FIBT ranking. Qualification is achieved by the results of athletes, who gain a qualification place for their NOC. Male and female athletes of non represented continents may also participate, with 1 male and 1 female athlete, provided that the maximum quota of 15 men and 15 women is not yet filled

Medal summary

Medal table

Events

Qualification system
Each nation could send a maximum of 4 athletes (2 boys and 2 girls). The FIBT ranking were used to allocate places to NOC's. Participation, for each of the men’s and women’s competitions, was limited to a total of 15 athletes, including the host nation. The NOC quotas were based on the updated FIBT ranking which was released by FIBT at a later time. Qualification was achieved by the results of athletes, who gained a qualification place for their NOC.

Boys'
The FIBT did not release a final list of qualified teams, this is just a list of teams in alphabetical order according to qualification system.

Girls'
The FIBT did not release a final list of qualified teams, this is just a list of teams in alphabetical order according to qualification system.

Qualification summary

References

 
2012 in skeleton
2012 Winter Youth Olympics events
2012